Klimeschia lutumella is a moth in the Douglasiidae family. It was described by Hans Georg Amsel in 1938. It is found in Israel.

References

Moths described in 1938
Douglasiidae